Parchowski may refer to the following places in Poland:

Parchowski Bór
Parchowski Młyn